Palpita uedai is a moth in the family Crambidae. It was described by Inoue in 1997. It is found in Indonesia (Sulawesi) and Australia.

References

Moths described in 1997
Palpita
Moths of Indonesia
Moths of Australia